Ralph Farquhar (born September 19, 1951) is an American film and television producer and writer, and playwright. He is the co-creator of three sitcoms set in South Central, Los Angeles, California: the Fox sitcom South Central, and, with Sara Finney-Johnson and Vida Spears,  the UPN sitcoms Moesha, starring Brandy, and its spinoff The Parkers, starring Countess Vaughn and Mo'Nique.

Farquhar first attended the United States Military Academy at West Point before receiving a Bachelor of Arts degree in communications from the University of Illinois. His writing credits include Happy Days, Fame, and Married...with Children. He has also served as an executive producer on The Sinbad Show, The Proud Family, and Real Husbands of Hollywood, and was the screenwriter of the 1985 film Krush Groove, starring Run-DMC.

More recently, he signed an overall deal with Disney.

Personal life 
His younger brother is Kurt Farquhar, a composer for film and television who has written themes and scores for several of the elder Farquhar's shows. His son is rapper and producer Regan Farquhar, best known under the stage name Busdriver.

References

External links

1951 births
20th-century African-American writers
20th-century American male writers
20th-century American screenwriters
21st-century African-American writers
21st-century American male writers
21st-century American screenwriters
African-American male writers
African-American screenwriters
African-American television producers
American television writers
Living people
Screenwriters from Illinois
Television producers from California
Writers from Chicago